"Miracle Aligner" is the fourth single by English band The Last Shadow Puppets from their second studio album, Everything You've Come to Expect. It was released on 28 March 2016 on Domino Records.

Background and release
The song was premiered on Zane Lowe's Beats 1 Radio show, where Zane named it his "World Record" for March 28, 2016. The duo jokingly claimed the song was inspired by a "yoga teacher" and a "make-believe wrestler." Turner then said the idea for the song "had always been around" and "came back in the end." He continued by saying that the song was mostly written by himself and his friend and musician Alexandra Savior and "ended up being under the Shadow Puppets umbrella."

Savior has said the song is "obviously about a coke dealer - it's a lifestyle that I didn't relate to myself."

Music video 
The music video for "Miracle Aligner", directed by Saam Farahmand, and shot at Hotel Café Royal in London, was first released onto YouTube on 17 May 2016.

The video begins with Kane and Turner standing in a balcony while rose petals fall from the sky. A dialogue, dubbed in Italian, occurs between the two, where Kane asks "What's this?", to which Turner responds "This...This is an attempt to extract truth...approximately." In the next shot, now inside an empty ornate room, Turner and Kane stand in front of each other, wearing cream coloured suits and looking extremely tanned, an allusion to the events shown in the Aviation and Everything You've Come to Expect music videos.  Turner and Kane start dancing across the room. A circular dolly shot reveals they are being observed by a film crew. They keep dancing in a choreographed manner while looking into the camera. The video ends with the film crew leaving while Kane and Turner, now looking at each other, keep dancing. Turner kneels on the ground, Kane embraces him, and both collapse on top of each other.

Personnel
The Last Shadow Puppets
Alex Turner – vocals, guitar, percussion
Miles Kane – vocals
James Ford – drums, percussion, keys
Zach Dawes – bass guitar

String section
Leah Katz, Rodney Wirtz – viola
Richard Dodd, John Krovoza, Peggy Baldwin – cello
Eric Gorfain, Marisa Kuney, Amy Wickman, Daphne Chen, Gina Kronstadt, Alwyn Wright, Chris Woods – violin
Ian Walker – contrabass
Sara Andon – flute

Additional personnel
Owen Pallett – strings arrangement

Charts

References

External links
 

2016 singles
2016 songs
The Last Shadow Puppets songs
Songs written by Alex Turner (musician)
Song recordings produced by James Ford (musician)
Domino Recording Company singles
Alexandra Savior songs